A Jok is a class of spirit within the traditional Acholi belief system that are viewed as the cause of illness. Traditional healers (known as ajakwa) first identify the Jok in question and then make an appropriate sacrifice and ceremony to counter them.  Alternatively if such an approach was unsuccessful the person possessed by the jok could go through a series of rituals to gain some level of control over the jok and then themselves become ajakwa.

The range of Jok is extensive and includes a number that have been influenced by the experience of colonization.

References

Acholi
African mythology